Alejandra Peña is a Venezuelan politician, currently an alternate deputy for the National Assembly for the  Barinas state.

Career 
She was elected as alternate deputy for the National Assembly for the  Barinas state for the 2016-2021 term in the 2015 parliamentary elections, representing the Democratic Unity Roundtable (MUD). Peña was among the deputies who voted, as alternate for deputy , to ratify Juan Guaidó as president of the National Assembly in the 2020 Assembly Delegate Commission election.

See also 
 IV National Assembly of Venezuela

References

External links 

21st-century Venezuelan women politicians
21st-century Venezuelan politicians
Living people
Year of birth missing (living people)